The 1988 Notre Dame Fighting Irish football team represented the University of Notre Dame during the 1988 NCAA Division I-A football season.  The Irish, coached by Lou Holtz, ended the season with 12 wins and no losses, winning the national championship.  The Fighting Irish won the title by defeating the previously unbeaten and No. 3 ranked West Virginia Mountaineers in the Sunkist Fiesta Bowl in Tempe, Arizona, by a score of a 34–21. The 1988 squad, one of 11 national title squads for the Irish, is considered to be one of the best undefeated teams in the history of college football.  The Irish beat the teams which finished the season ranked #2, #4, #5, and #7 in the AP Poll. They also won 10 of 12 games by double digits.  The 1988 squad is best remembered for its 31–30 upset of No. 1 ranked Miami, ending their 36-game regular season  winning streak.  The game is remembered to this day as one of the most memorable games in all of college football.

Schedule

Personnel

Rankings

Game summaries

Michigan

13th ranked Notre Dame debuted its season against No. 9 Michigan in Notre Dame Stadium.  In a 19-17 thriller, walk-on kicker Reggie Ho kicked a 26-yard field goal winner with 1:13 remaining. Lou Holtz's concerns about his youthful offense and green receivers were realized as the Irish offense did not score a single offensive touchdown.  In addition to Reggie Ho's game winner, the Irish kicker scored 3 other field goals.  The lone touchdown from Notre Dame came from a Ricky Watters punt return, an 81-yard runback.  Michigan's Mike Gillette, who had given the Wolverines the lead with 5:34 left by kicking a 49-yard field goal, had one final chance to give Michigan the win, narrowly missing from 48 yards as the final gun sounded.

at Michigan State

    
    
    
    
    

MSU threatened Notre Dame early with a 1st-quarter field goal, but that would be the only points of the day the Notre Dame defense would allow as the Irish downed MSU 20-3.  Notre Dame struggled early in the contest, accumulating only 50 yards running on 21 carries.  Reggie Ho tied the game with 31-yarder in the second quarter and put the Irish ahead 6-3 at the half with a 22-yard field goal.  The second half was a different story for the Irish offense, as quarterback Tony Rice and company amassed 195 yards on 33 carries in the second half.  156 yards came on 19 carries in the third quarter alone. Tony Rice ran for an 8-yard touchdown and Michael Stonebreaker added a 39-yard interception return for a touchdown in the final quarter to end any hopes of a Spartan upset. The star of the game was Notre Dame's defense, which held the Spartans to 89 yards rushing for the game.  Running back Mark Green led the Irish rushing attack with 125 yards on the ground.

Purdue

Source: 
    
    
    
    
    
    
    
    
    

Tony Rice passed for two touchdowns and ran for another as Notre Dame shredded Purdue 52-7.  It was one of the worst losses by Purdue in the history of the series, and its worst loss since a 48-0 drubbing in 1970.  Notre Dame scored early and often, starting with a 38-yard Rice option run for a touchdown.  Tony Rice's first passing touchdown on the year was an 8-yarder to freshman tight end Derek Brown. The Irish exploded for 28 points in the second quarter, highlighted by a 54-yard Rice touchdown pass to Rocket Ismail.  Tailback Mark Green added a 7-yard touchdown run and Ricky Watters returned a punt 66 yards for a score.  Coach Lou Holtz used three separate quarterbacks in the second quarter and four total in the game.  3rd-string quarterback Steve Belles hit running back Tony Brooks for a 34-yard score to put the Irish up 42-0 at half-time. The second half saw the Irish score ten points with back-ups, a 44-yard field goal by Billy Hackett and a 36-yard run from freshman fullback Rodney Culver.  Purdue's lone touchdown was a fourth quarter 7-yard pass from Brian Fox to Calvin Williams.  The Irish improved to 3-0 while the Boilermakers dropped to 1-2 on the year.

Stanford

Tony Rice rushed for two touchdowns and passed for a third to lead the Fighting Irish to a 42-14 blowout of Stanford.  Rice completed 11 of 14 passes for 129 yards and rushed for 107 yards.  Rice scored runs of 30 yards and 6 yards while the Irish tailbacks added 3 other scores with touchdowns from Mark Green, Tony Brooks, and Anthony Johnson.  Despite the lopsided score, Stanford did mount two of the longest scoring drives against the Irish to date, with a 68-yard drive by quarterback Brian Johnson and a 73-yard drive by back-up quarterback Jason Palumbis.  Freshman standout tight end Derek Brown added the Irish's sole passing touchdown in the 3rd quarter.  The Irish defense stymied the Cardinal, holding them to just 111 yards in the first half.

at Pittsburgh

Notre Dame, a loser to Pittsburgh three years in a row, narrowly avoided another such upset as the Irish improved to 5-0 on the season.  The 30-20 victory in the rain did little to inspire confidence that Notre Dame could beat No. 1 Miami the following week. The Panthers made a number of critical mistakes that led the Panthers to believe they did more to lose the game more than Notre Dame did to win it.
"We could have won the game," said Panther coach Mike Gottfried, "but we made just enough mistakes to lose it."

Notre Dame struggled to contain Panther quarterback Darnell Dickerson, who at times had 10 seconds or more per play.  The Panthers came out strong early, starting the game with an impressive drive, but before the Panthers could score, Irish cornerback Todd Lyght forced a fumble, which Chris Zorich recovered.  After a stalled Irish drive, the Panthers got the ball back and took a 7-0 lead on a Dickerson touchdown.  Notre Dame answered back with a 52-yard Tony Brooks run to the 2-yard line. The large run was the result of a failed Panther blitz attempt.  Tony Rice scored on a 2-yard keeper to tie the game 7-7.  After an Anthony Johnson touchdown gave the Irish a 14-7 lead, Dickerson scored his second touchdown to tie the game again at 14-14.  Reggie Ho scored a 37-yard field goal to give the Irish a 17-14 half time lead.

The critical moment of the game came in the second half, when late into the fourth quarter the Irish were clinging to a 23-20 lead when the Panthers forced the Irish into a 4th and long from their own 23-yard line.  But a late 12 men on the field penalty against the Panthers gave the Irish new life. The 15-yard penalty gave Notre Dame the ball on its 48-yard line, and 11 plays later Mark Green ran for an 8-yard touchdown with 4:30 left in the game to put victory out of reach for the Panthers.  Tony Rice went 8-14 passing for the game and a third quarter Braxston Banks touchdown gave the Irish the lead for good.

Miami

Source: 
    
    
    
    
    
    
    
    
    
    

The October 15, 1988, game between Notre Dame and the University of Miami Hurricanes is colloquially referred to as the "Catholics vs. Convicts" game. The University of Notre Dame was dubbed the "Catholics" and the University of Miami was dubbed as "the Convicts".

Air Force

A potential letdown after defeating No. 1 Miami the previous week never materialized for the now 2nd ranked Irish, who used a second half onslaught of power running to down the Falcons 41-13.  Coach Holtz admitted he was scared all week of a potential upset of his young Notre Dame squad.  Of main concern was Air Force's wishbone ground attack, which came into Notre Dame Stadium averaging 46 points and 432 rushing yards a game.  Falcons coach Fisher DeBerry's squad had the best ground gaining offense in the nation.  Holtz's fears seemed to be valid during the rain in the first half as Notre Dame only held a 7-point lead at the half.

Air Force opened the game with an impressive ground attack. Air Force quarterback Dee Dowis took his team inside the Irish 20 on the game's first offensive drive. But Pat Terrell, the defensive hero of last week's victory over Miami, stepped into the spotlight again, this time with Stan Smagala.  Albert Booker, an Air Force halfback, was carrying the ball on second down when Smagala hit him hard.  The ball popped free and Terrell recovered the fumble at the Notre Dame 16.  After the turnover, Air Force answered with its first field goal by Steve Yarborough from 22 yards out.  But Notre Dame matched that by going 71 yards to score on Mark Green's 7-yard touchdown run.  In the second quarter, The Irish continued to run the ball, with quarterback Tony Rice and running back Anthony Johnson both running for touchdowns.  Air Force answered before the end of the half with a touchdown to cut Notre Dame's lead to just seven points.

The third quarter was all Irish, as five Irish running backs combined for 283 yards, all running for 23 yards or more.  One of the highlights was a 50-yard halfback pass late in the third quarter thrown by 3rd-string quarterback Steve Belles. In at running back, Belles took a pitch from Tony Rice, stepped back to his right and threw to a wide open Ricky Watters. The flanker took the ball inside the Air Force 10 and battled his way just over the goal line late in the third quarter. Other scores included a Tony Brooks 42-yard touchdown in the third quarter and another Ricky Watters touchdown catch; this time a 28-yarder from Rice.  In the end, the Irish defense held the explosive Falcons to 54 yards rushing in the second half and 195 for the game,  237 yards below its season average.

at Navy

Although unbeaten and No. 2 Notre Dame posted its 25th consecutive victory of the Naval Academy, coach Lou Holtz was not happy.  "We couldn't control the line of scrimmage," Holtz said after the victory. "We couldn't throw consistently, we weren't mentally alert and that's my fault. Our offensive line got beat up, we couldn't run inside. We weren't good enough to beat them inside. We're not a very good team right now. We feel fortunate to win." Favored to beat Navy by five touchdowns, the Irish dropped five passes, lost two fumbles, shanked a punt for a mere 10 yds., and got whistled for having twelve men on the field - all before winning the game 22-7.  The Midshipmen fumbled on their second play from scrimmage and six plays later Notre Dame led 7-0 on a 10-yard touchdown pass from Rice to Derek Brown, before a crowd of 54,926 at Memorial Stadium.  Rodney Culver and Ryan Mihalko ran for touchdowns as Notre Dame opened up a 22-0 lead early in the third quarter en route to reaching an 8-0 record for the first time since 1973.  One positive Lou Holtz saw was the play of the defense.  "Our defense played really well, but was on the field too long."  Notre Dame amassed 396 total yards and held Navy to 192 yards, the lowest for an Irish opponent this year.

Rice

The Irish scored early and often as Notre Dame dazzled their home crowd of 59,075 with a 54-11 victory.  After Rice scored an early field goal in the first quarter, Rocket Ismail returned his first of two kickoffs, a 78-yard return for a score.  The Irish offense quickly followed with three touchdowns on their first three offensive possessions.  Junior fullback Anthony Johnson rushed for two of Notre Dame's seven TDs, while Tony Brooks and Rodney Culver also added touchdowns.  Late in the game, after Rice's third field goal made the score 38-9, Rocket Ismail returned the ensuing kickoff 83 yards for another touchdown.  Ismail became the first Notre Dame player to return two kick-offs for touchdowns in a game since Paul Castner in 1922 against Kalamazoo.  After Notre Dame's final touchdown, Rice LB Billy Stone returned the blocked extra-point all the way for two points to account for the final score of 54-11.  This was the first time a team scored by returning a failed conversion in NCAA Div I history (the rule allowing for the defense to score this way instituted at the start of the 1988-89 season).

Penn State

The Irish came into the game at 9-0 while Penn State was 5-5, on the verge of their first losing season in 50 years. Notre Dame got started early, scoring on their first possession, an 87-yard on 12 play drive.  On second-and-5 from Penn State's 48-yard line, Tony Rice threw a 17-yard pass to Ricky Watters, who was wide open 15 yards downfield.  Five plays later, Notre Dame scored from Penn State's two. Rice optioned left, froze the Penn State linebacker Eddie Johnson with a pump-fake, then ran into the end zone.  Reggie Ho's extra point made it 7-0.  In the second quarter, Notre Dame drove 60 yards in five plays to go ahead, 14-0.  Rice set up the score with another pass to Watters - a 27-yard play that moved the ball to Penn State's 33-yard line.  Two plays later, running back Mark Green took a handoff up the middle, then found daylight to his right and ran 22 yards for a touchdown.  Penn State's only score came on the last play of the first half, when Eric Etze kicked a 52-yard field goal.

After leading by 14-3 at halftime, Notre Dame struck quickly for its final score in the third quarter.  On first down after a Penn State punt, Tony Rice threw a 67-yard touchdown pass to Raghib Ismail.  It was the first time the Fighting Irish had thrown deep all game, and the long pass caught Penn State defensive backs off guard.  Ismail was so wide open, he scored even though he had to wait for Rice's underthrown pass. After making the catch at Penn State's 20-yard line, Ismail broke Eddie Johnson's attempted tackle and jogged into the end zone. The win set the stage for the next week's showdown vs. USC, the final hurdle to the national championship game.

at USC

Source: 
    
    
    
    
    
    

Notre Dame and USC entered the game undefeated and ranked number one and two respectively for the first time ever in their storied series. It was also the 24th time No. 1 faced No. 2 in college football history.  In a controversial move, coach Lou Holtz took his 10-0 Irish squad to L.A. without stars Ricky Watters and Tony Brooks, whom he suspended for disciplinary reasons. The USC Trojans were having a great season under head coach Larry Smith and standout quarterback Rodney Peete. The Irish came into the game as underdogs, but spectacular play of defensive end Frank Stams and cornerback Stan Smagala aided the Irish offense, led by Tony Rice, to an Irish victory.  Notre Dame started out fast with Tony Rice surprising the crowd by throwing deep to Raghib Ismail on the first play of scrimmage. On the very next play, Tony Rice optioned left for a 65-yard touchdown play. The Trojans were listless, committing four turnovers, including a back-breaking Rodney Peete interception to Stan Smagala for another Notre Dame touchdown. In the second half, running back Mark Green added the final touchdown of the day(aided by a key 22-yard gain on a 3rd down screen play by Anthony Johnson) to help defeat the Trojans. The sellout crowd of 93,829 was the largest in this rivalry since 1955.

Fiesta Bowl

Aftermath
The 1988 Irish squad won their 11th consensus national title in Lou Holtz's third year as an Irish head coach, equaling the trend of Irish coaches winning the title in their third year.  Irish head coaches Frank Leahy, Ara Parseghian and Dan Devine also won titles in their third years as head coach.  Holtz was named national coach of the year for taking the Irish squad from an 8-4 record the previous year to national title winners the following year. His 1989 and 1993 squads narrowly missed repeating the feat.

As of 2020, the 1988 Irish squad is also the most recent to win the national title.

Awards and honors
All-Americans

Paul "Bear" Bryant Award Coach of the Year
Lou Holtz

Eddie Robinson Coach of the Year Award
Lou Holtz

College Football Hall of Fame inductees

Notre Dame leads all universities in players inducted.

Future NFL Players
The following is a list of Notre Dame players that would go on to play or be drafted to play in the National Football League over the next four years. All players listed played for the 1988 team.

Source:

References

Notre Dame
Notre Dame Fighting Irish football seasons
College football national champions
Fiesta Bowl champion seasons
College football undefeated seasons
Notre Dame Fighting Irish football